James Michie  (24 June 1927 – 30 October 2007) was an English poet, translator and editor.

Michie was born in Weybridge, Surrey, the son of a banker and the younger brother of Donald Michie, a researcher in artificial intelligence.

The texts that Michie translated included The Odes of Horace, The Art of Love by Ovid, The Poems of Catullus, The Epigrams of Martial and selections from  La Fontaine's and Aesop's fables. He was the editorial director of The Bodley Head, a British publishing company, and lecturer at London University. His Collected Poems won the 1995 Hawthornden Prize.

Beginning in the 1970s, Michie devised and judged literary competitions for The Spectator under the pen-name of Jaspistos.

He caused controversy in 2004 when his poem, "Friendly Fire," was published in The Spectator under then-editor Boris Johnson.

References

1927 births
2007 deaths
British poets